The 1983 DFB-Pokal Final decided the winner of the 1982–83 DFB-Pokal, the 40th season of Germany's knockout football cup competition. It was played on 11 June 1983, and was the first and to date the only cup final between two teams from the same city, which was contested between Cologne clubs 1. FC Köln, playing in the Bundesliga, and Fortuna Köln, playing in the 2. Bundesliga. Fittingy, the match took place in Cologne, at the Müngersdorfer Stadion. 1. FC Köln won the derby match 1–0 to claim their 4th cup title.

Route to the final
The DFB-Pokal began with 64 teams in a single-elimination knockout cup competition. There were a total of five rounds leading up to the final. Teams were drawn against each other, and the winner after 90 minutes would advance. If still tied, 30 minutes of extra time was played. If the score was still level, a replay would take place at the original away team's stadium. If still level after 90 minutes, 30 minutes of extra time was played. If the score was still level, a penalty shoot-out was used to determine the winner.

Note: In all results below, the score of the finalist is given first (H: home; A: away).

Match

Details

References

External links
 Match report at kicker.de 
 Match report at WorldFootball.net
 Match report at Fussballdaten.de 

1. FC Köln matches
SC Fortuna Köln matches
1982–83 in German football cups
1983
Sports competitions in Cologne
June 1983 sports events in Europe
1980s in Cologne